Reyhaneh Jabbari ( 1988 – 25 October 2014) was a woman convicted of murdering Morteza Abdolali Sarbandi, a former agent of the Iranian Ministry of Intelligence in Iran. She was in prison from 2007 until her execution by hanging in October 2014 for killing her alleged rapist. She published her recollection of the events while in prison. Mohammad Mostafaei was her first lawyer. He published her story in his blog. According to Iranian law, after her guilt was proven and her claim of self-defense was considered untrue, only the victim's family had the right to stop the execution; despite efforts by the Prosecutor's Office, the victim's family insisted on proceeding with the execution.

Background
In 2007, Sarbandi met Jabbari, who was an interior decorator, in a cafe and convinced her to visit his office to discuss a business deal. While at the office, Sarbandi allegedly tried to rape Jabbari. She grabbed a pocket knife and stabbed him, then fled the scene leaving him to bleed to death.

The United Nations Human Rights Rapporteur in Iran, Ahmed Shaheed, said that Jabbari was hired by Sarbandi to redesign his office and took her to an apartment where she was sexually abused by him. Sarbandi's family insisted that it was premeditated murder as Jabbari confessed to buying a knife two days before the killing. However, it is alleged that police coerced her into giving a false confession after she was tortured and when her interrogators threatened to harm her sister. Many international human rights groups have repeatedly asked for a new trial due to strong concerns of corruption and repeated mishandling of the case by Iranian authorities.

Arrest and trial
After her arrest, Jabbari was kept in solitary confinement for two months, without access to her family or a lawyer. In 2009, she was sentenced to death by a Tehran court. According to Amnesty International, Jabbari had admitted stabbing Sarbandi, but had claimed that someone else in the house had killed him.

Amnesty International, United Nations and the European Union had lobbied for her life to be spared. Her punishment was postponed from the original April 2014 date after a global campaign to stop her execution attracted 20,000 signatures.

On 29 September 2014, it was announced that her execution was imminent. On 1 October 2014, it was reported that plans to execute her had been halted for the time being. There were campaigns launched on social media to halt her execution, but Tasnim reported that Jabbari's relatives failed to gain consent for a reprieve from the victim's family.

Death and legacy
Reihaneh Jabbari was executed by hanging on 25 October 2014 at dawn at the Gohardasht Prison, north of Karaj.

MEK's official website later said, in an unsourced article that didn't present any actual evidence, that Reyhaneh had left her mother a recorded final message, imploring her to ensure that her organs be donated anonymously.

International reactions
Amnesty International commented that Jabbari was convicted after a flawed investigation and that her claims that another person who was present in the home killed Sarbandi were not properly investigated.

Italian Nobel Prize in Literature Dario Fo dedicates to Jabbari a painting, titled Portrait of Reyhaneh Jabbari.

Tehran Prosecutor's Office statement 
After the execution, and in response to international and domestic reactions, Tehran Prosecutor's office made a statement meant to clarify some of the details of Jabbari's legal dossier.

The Prosecutor's Office, inter alia, claims:
 Jabbari was investigated as a suspect because of the last call on the victim's cell phone. The police found a bloodied scarf, bloodied knife, and the original cover of the knife in Jabbari's place.
 Jabbari accepted that she had bought the knife 2 days before the incident
 Jabbari had sent a text message to a friend of hers three days before the incident saying "I think I will kill him tonight."
 Jabbari first claimed the involvement of a different man named "Sheikhi" in the incident. After she failed to identify the man, she said that her original statement was false and she had only tried to derail the investigation.
 The claims that Jabbari made in the final months (before the execution), were only a repetition of her previous claims that were investigated one-by-one and found baseless by the five judges of the criminal court of the province and the judges of the National Supreme Court. Despite this, the Prosecutor's Office reportedly tried its best to bring the two families together; the victim's family in the end refused to forgive Jabbari, ensuring her execution.

References

External links
 Good Bye Reyhaneh - Music composed by Hussam Ezz Eldin
Artistic re-recording of Reyhaneh's last voice message, made by Loulou R. D. (Lama)
English text of Reyhaneh Jabbari's last voice message, National Council of Resistance of Iran

1980s births
2014 deaths
21st-century executions by Iran
Executed Iranian women
Executed Iranian people
Iranian people convicted of murder
People convicted of murder by Iran
Date of birth missing